The papillose woolly bat (Kerivoula papillosa) is a species of vesper bat in the family Vespertilionidae.
It is found in Brunei, India, Indonesia, Malaysia, and Vietnam.

Appearance
The fur is typically dark brown on top, and lighter brown on the bottom. White hair is commonly found on the foot as well. This species has a unique interfemoral membrane. This membrane is hairless and is covered with small, soft, wart-like projections. The teeth are pointed and specialized for crushing the exoskeletons of insects.

Ecology
Tree hollows are used for roosts, and generally have between 1 and 14 bats inhabiting them. The habitats inhabited are lowland mixed deciduous forests in the lower Asian peninsula.

References

External links
ARKive Photos and text.

Kerivoulinae
Bats of Asia
Bats of Southeast Asia
Bats of Indonesia
Bats of Malaysia
Mammals of India
Mammals of Brunei
Mammals of Vietnam
Taxonomy articles created by Polbot
Mammals described in 1840
Taxa named by Coenraad Jacob Temminck